The Nation of Celestial Space (also known as Celestia) is a micronation created by Evergreen Park, Illinois resident James Thomas Mangan. Celestia comprised the entirety of "outer space", which Mangan laid claim to on behalf of humanity to ensure that no one country might establish a political hegemony there. As "Founder and First Representative", he registered this acquisition with the Recorder of Deeds and Titles of Cook County on January 1, 1949. At its foundation Celestia claimed to have 19 members, among them Mangan's daughter Ruth; a decade later a booklet published by the group claimed that membership had grown to 19,057.

Mangan was active for many years in pursuing his claims on behalf of Celestia; in 1949 he notified the United States, Soviet Union, United Kingdom and United Nations that Celestia had banned all further atmospheric nuclear tests. Later, as the space race got underway in earnest he sent angry letters of protest to the leaders of the Soviet Union and United States on the occasions that their early space flights encroached upon his territory - although he later waived these proscriptions to allow for satellite launches by the latter.

While Mangan and Celestia were politely ignored by the superpowers, there is evidence that at least some others were prepared to entertain his claims with a greater degree of seriousness; the first unfurling of the Celestian flag - featuring a blue sharp symbol within a white disc against a blue field - was broadcast in June 1958 to a television audience of millions across the U.S., and the following day the flag was raised at the United Nations building in New York City, to fly alongside those of the member nations of that organisation.

Despite these efforts, the Nation of Celestial Space is thought to have become defunct with the death of its founder. Its only surviving legacy is the series of stamps and silver and gold coins and passports issued in its name by Mangan from the late 1950s through to the mid-1960s. 

Some of the coins minted by Celestia included a silver "1 Joule" of 4.15 grams (.925 silver) and a gold "1 Celeston" of 2.20 grams (.900 gold). Their scarcity ensures that they sell for many hundreds of dollars apiece on the rare occasions they come to market.

James Thomas Mangan's descendants include his son, James C. Mangan (deceased), his daughter Ruth Mangan Stump, "Princess of the Nation of Celestial Space" (deceased), and three grandsons, Glen Stump, "Duke of Mars", Dean Stump, "Duke of Selenia " and “First Representative  of The Nation of Celestial Space, and Todd Stump, "Duke of the Milky Way". There are also three sons of Glen Stump, Edward Stump “Duke of Sirius”, Dan Stump “Duke of Polaris” and Luke Walter Stump “Duke of Alpha Centauri”.

Declaration
The Declaration by the Nation of Celestial Space was issued by Celestia on December 21, 1948. It proclaims to establish the nation to "secure for sympathetic people, wherever they may live, the beauties and benefits of a vast domain yet unclaimed by any state or nation." The document goes on to explain the nature of Celestia's claim.

See also 
 List of micronations

References

 Science Illustrated article on James Mangam and Celestia from the Modern Mechanix website
 "Report to the Universe: The First Seven Years, a White Paper", James T. Mangan, 1956
 "State of the Sky; Second Report to the Universe", James T Mangan, 1958
 "Numismatic Scrapbook", February 1960, p571
 "Stamps", April 16, 1966, p129
 "The Numismatist", December 2001
 "Unusual World Coins", 4th Edition (2005) p497
 "Unreal Estate: The Men who Sold the Moon" by Virgiliu Pop pp. 25–40
 Strauss, Erwin S. How to Start Your Own Country, 2nd ed. Port Townsend, WA: Breakout Productions, 1984.

External links
 

Celestia
1949 establishments in the United States
States and territories established in 1949